Girls' shoot-out contest at the 2018 Summer Youth Olympics was held on 15 October 2018 at the Parque Mujeres Argentinas in Buenos Aires.

Results

References

External links

Shoot-out contest